Henry B. Christian (1883–1953) was a painter who was born in Minneapolis, Minnesota.  He studied at the Minneapolis Institute of Arts, and first visited Hawaii in 1908.  He made frequent trips between Minnesota and Hawaii before settling in Honolulu.  Christian was art director of Paradise of the Pacific 1908–10, 1917–19, and 1922–38.  He died in Honolulu on December 23, 1953.

References
 
Papanikolas, Theresa and DeSoto Brown, Art Deco Hawai'i, Honolulu, Honolulu Museum of Art, 2014, p. 66
 Severson, Don R. Finding Paradise: Island Art in Private Collections, University of Hawaii Press, 2002, pp. 216–7.
Hustace, James J.  Painters and Etchers of Hawaii-A Biographical Collection-1780-2018, Library of Congress (C)

Footnotes

20th-century American painters
American male painters
Artists from Hawaii
Artists from Minneapolis
1953 deaths
1883 births
20th-century American male artists